Diadesmola is a genus of moths in the subfamily Arctiinae. It contains the single species Diadesmola bicolor, which is found in Irian Jaya.

References

Natural History Museum Lepidoptera generic names catalog

Lithosiini